English Teachers (airing internationally as Taipei Diaries) is a Canadian documentary television series. The series, which airs on Canada's Life Network, and internationally, profiles several young Canadians teaching English as a Second Language in Taipei, Taiwan. It won an award for Best Documentary Series at the 2004 Yorkton Film Festival.

2000s Canadian documentary television series